Status: Free is a 2016 Russian romantic comedy directed by Pavel Ruminov.

Plot
Stand-up-comedian Nikita Kolesnikov (Danila Kozlovsky) is having a difficult time breaking up with his girlfriend Afina Gordeeva (Elizaveta Boyarskaya), who found herself a more promising partner - a successful 40-year old dentist. Nikita, trying to cope with this, goes through different stages - hatred, attempts to return the former beloved, until he realizes that he should not be afraid of parting, and perhaps this is the best thing that happened in his life.

Cast
Danila Kozlovsky - Nikita Kolesnikov
Elizaveta Boyarskaya - Afina Gordeeva
Vladimir Seleznev - Alexei Yartsev, dentist
Igor Voinarovsky - Vadik, friend of Nikita
Natalia Anisimova - Valya Valley
Paulina Andreeva - Sonya Shmul
Mikhail Krylov - Krylov, producer
Maria Starotorgskaya - lady at the corporate party
Nadezhda Zvenigorodskaya - Nikita's mother
Yulia Pak - colleague of Afina

Remake
The film was remade in Lithuania by director Andrius Žiurauskas.

References

External links

 Official website

Russian romantic comedy films
2016 romantic comedy films
2010s Russian-language films